The Samuel Ecological Station is a strictly protected ecological station in the state of Rondônia, Brazil.
It contains a tract of Amazon rainforest that extends east from the  reservoir formed by the Samuel Hydroelectric Dam.

Location

The Samuel State Ecological Station is in the northern portion of the state of Rondonia.
It covers part of the Jamari River basin and a large part of the reservoir of the Samuel Hydroelectric Dam.
The conservation unit extends the east from this reservoir.
It is bounded to the north by the Jequitibá Forestry Settlement Project (Projeto de Assentamento Florestal), to the north and east by the Jacundá National Forest and to the south by the Jamari National Forest.
The unit lies in the municipalities of Candeias do Jamari (76%} and Itapuã do Oeste (24%).

Environment

The conservation unit is completely covered with open rainforest of the Amazon biome.
The unit has diverse flora, with up to 200 species of trees per hectare.
Palm trees dominate the upper strata of poorly drained areas.
There are typical lowland forests in the flooded areas and along streams adapted to flood periods of up to eight months.

Conservation

The station has been threatened by illegal logging.
The Rondonia Environmental agency Secretaria de Estado do Desenvolvimento Ambiental (SEDAM) signed an agreement with Eletronorte in 2013 for mutual cooperation in protection and conservation actions for the Samuel station, without transfer of funds.
On 2015 an advisory council was formed with members from government and non-government institutions of the Candeias do Jamari and Itapuã d'Oeste municipalities, Vila Nova Samuel and the Jequitibá PAF farmers association.

Notes

Sources

1989 establishments in Brazil
Ecological stations of Brazil
Protected areas of Rondônia
Protected areas established in 1989